Hugh Galbraith (22 December 1868 – 1930) (another source believes Hugh Galbraith was born in Waterford, Ireland and was born on 2 December 1867) was a Scottish footballer, most notable as a player for Luton Town.

Career

According to the source that states Hugh Galbraith was born in Ireland also records that he started his career in 1886 at a club called Glasgow East End F.C.

In 1887 Galbraith then moved to  Dundee Our Boys. According to Wikipedia Galbraith joined a club that got to the Quarter-Finals of the Scottish Cup. Whether Galbraith played in the Scottish Cup matches in unknown.

Galbraith started his career in England with Bootle in Feb-1889. He played for Bootle in a FA Cup tie against "The Invincibles," Preston North End F.C.. Bootle lost 0-3.  In February or March 1889 he signed for Accrington. On 23 March 1889 at Thorneyholme Road the home of Accrington FC he made his League and Accrington debut against Bolton Wanderers. Galbraith played as a Inside Forward and Accrington lost 2-3.

He then spent one-year spells with Middlesbrough Ironopolis and Burnley before arriving at Luton Town in 1892. After five years with the club, Galbraith left, but returned a year later for another season with Luton. He finally departed Luton for good in 1899, when he joined Glossop North End for a solitary season before retiring.
|

Statistics
Source:

References

1868 births
1930 deaths
Scottish footballers
English Football League players
Southern Football League players
Accrington F.C. players
Burnley F.C. players
Luton Town F.C. players
Glossop North End A.F.C. players
People from Govan
Footballers from Glasgow
Association football wingers